Françoise Lebrun (born 18 August 1944) is a French actress. She has appeared in many movies, and is especially known for her role as Veronika in Jean Eustache's The Mother and the Whore (1973). She has worked with other directors including Paul Vecchiali, Marguerite Duras and Lucas Belvaux, and is the subject of the documentary Françoise Lebrun, les voies singulières (2008). In a Variety review of the Vecchiali film A Vot' Bon Coeur (2004), Lisa Nesselson called her "a supreme master of the sustained monologue."

Filmography

Theater

References

External links

Françoise Lebrun, les voies singulières on IMDB.

1944 births
Living people
French film actresses
French television actresses
20th-century French actresses
21st-century French actresses
French women screenwriters
French screenwriters
French documentary filmmakers
Women documentary filmmakers